The Big Wheel is a studio album by the Scottish Celtic rock band Runrig, released in 1991. The album peaked at No. 4 on the UK Albums Chart.

Critical reception

The Kitchener-Waterloo Record wrote that "Donnie Munro's vocals drive the songs, but Iain Bayne's superbly produced drums power the band itself." The Calgary Herald labeled the album "an inoffensive, watered-down brand of Celtic rock... Uninspiring but professional."

Track listing
All songs written by Calum Macdonald and Rory Macdonald. 
 "Headlights" - 5:09
 "Healer in Your Heart" - 5:34
 "Abhainn an t-Sluaigh" (The Crowded River) - 5:17
 "Always the Winner" - 5:41
 "This Beautiful Pain" - 4:15
 "An Cuibhle Mòr" (The Big Wheel) - 6:07
 "Edge of the World" - 5:00
 "Hearthammer" - 4:27
 "I'll Keep Coming Home" - 2:33
 "Flower of the West" - 6:36

Personnel
Runrig
Iain Bayne - drums, percussion
Malcolm Jones - guitars, banjo, accordion
Calum Macdonald - percussion
Rory Macdonald - bass guitar, vocals
Donnie Munro - lead vocals
Peter Wishart - keyboards

References

Runrig albums
1991 albums
Chrysalis Records albums
Scottish Gaelic music